The Iron Heart is a 1920 American silent drama film directed by Denison Clift and starring Madlaine Traverse, George A. McDaniel, and Edwin B. Tilton.

Plot
As described in a film magazine, John Regan's (Tilton) daughter Esther (Traverse) assumes management of the Regan Steel Mills upon her father's death. The Associated Trust endeavors to gain control of the mills, but meets with rebuff at the hands of Esther. Darwin McAllister (McDaniel), employed by the Trust to get Esther to sell out, finds himself in love with her and resigns from the Associated. He is employed by Miss Regan and thus arouses the jealousy of Dan Cullen (Deeley), a dishonest employee of the Regan plant. Dan attempts to block the shipment of a consignment of steel, but Darwin and a group of loyal employees rout the Trust's hired bullies and get the shipment through.

Cast
 Madlaine Traverse as Esther Regan
 George A. McDaniel as Darwin McAllister
 Edwin B. Tilton as John Regan
 Melbourne MacDowell as Cyrus K. Moulton
 Ben Deeley as Dan Cullen

References

Bibliography
 Solomon, Aubrey. The Fox Film Corporation, 1915-1935. A History and Filmography. McFarland & Co, 2011.

External links

1920 films
Films directed by Denison Clift
American silent feature films
1920s English-language films
Fox Film films
American black-and-white films
1920 drama films
Silent American drama films
1920s American films